Chipseal (also chip seal or chip and seal) is a pavement surface treatment that combines one or more layer(s) of asphalt with one or more layer(s) of fine aggregate. In the United States, chipseals are typically used on rural roads carrying lower traffic volumes, and the process is often referred to as asphaltic surface treatment. This type of surface has a variety of other names including tar-seal or tarseal, tar and chip, sprayed seal or surface dressing.

In Australia as well as New Zealand, chipseal roads are common, including usage on major highways

Uses
Chipsealing is cheaper than resurfacing an asphalt concrete or a Portland cement concrete pavement, but not as long-lasting.

Installation
Chipseals are constructed by evenly distributing a thin base of hot tar, bitumen or asphalt onto an existing pavement and then embedding finely graded aggregate into it. The aggregate is evenly distributed over the hot seal spray, then rolled into the bitumen using heavy rubber tired rollers creating a paved surface. A chip-seal-surfaced pavement can optionally be sealed with a top layer, which is referred to as a fog seal or enrichment. 

The introduction of polymer-modified bitumen and emulsion binder has increased chipseal's ability to prevent crack reflection and improve stone retention by improving the properties of the bitumen binder. Newer techniques use asphalt emulsion (a mixture of liquid asphalt, surfactant, and water) instead of asphalt. This has been shown to help reduce aggregate loss and reduce cost of installation, but can increase stripping (separation of the binder from the aggregate). It reduces emissions of volatile organic compounds (VOCs) due to the lower solvent content. New methods also utilize cross linking styrene acrylic polymers which also provide quality water resistance. Chips precoated with about one percent bitumen have been used successfully to minimize aggregate loss and to give the surface a black look.
 
It can keep good pavement in good condition by sealing out water, but provides no structural strength and will repair only minor cracks. While the small stones used as surface yield a relatively even surface without the edges of patches, it also results in a very rough surface that leads to louder rolling noise from automobile wheels.

Although chipseal is an effective low-cost way to repair road, it has some drawbacks. Loose crushed stone is often left on the surface, owing to underapplication of bitumen or overapplication of stone. If not removed, this can cause safety and environmental problems such as cracked windshields, chipped paint, loss-of-control crashes (especially for motorcyclists, bicyclists and small trucks), and deposition of foreign material into drainage courses. Therefore, it is very important to sweep the road after the emulsion sets. As mentioned earlier, this problem can be minimized by using chips precoated with bitumen. Overapplication of emulsion can lead to bleeding, a condition where the excess asphalt rises to the surface, creating a very smooth surface that is very slippery when wet and bubbling in the hotter summer months. As cars drive over it the tires kick up this tarry substance on to the side of the car. It can only be cleaned off with a solvent remover or diesel fuel.

Noise and vibrational effects 

The rough wearing surface of the chipseal generates more roadway noise at any operating speed than do typical asphalt or concrete surfaces. These sound intensities increase with higher vehicle speeds. There is a considerable range in acoustical intensities produced depending upon the specific tire tread design and its interaction with the roadway surface type.

The rough surface causes noticeable increases in vibration and rolling resistance for bicyclists, and increased tire wear in all types of tires. 

Vehicle speed can affect the set up time with chipseal.

See also
Macadam
Asphalt
Bituminous surface

References

External links
City of Grand Junction, CO page on Chipseal
TRL Design Guide for Surface Dressing (Road Note 39)

Pavements
Building materials
Stone (material)
New Zealand inventions